William Earl Dodge III (October 17, 1858 – September 14, 1884), was an American college football player at Princeton University, captain of the national champion 1877 Princeton Tigers football team.

Early life
Dodge was born in New York City on October 17, 1858.  Commonly known as Earl, he was the eldest son of William E. Dodge Jr.  Along with his younger brother Cleveland Hoadley Dodge, he attended Williston Seminary at Easthampton, Massachusetts, and was a good friend of Woodrow Wilson at Princeton.

Career
Dodge was the captain of the national champion 1877 Princeton Tigers football team.

He also led the meeting of the group on Nov. 18, 1876, in East College that launched the collegiate branch of the International YMCA.

Personal life

In 1879, he was married to Emmeline Harriman (1859–1938), daughter of Oliver Harriman  and the sister of Anne Harriman Vanderbilt, Oliver Harriman, Jr., J. Borden Harriman, and Herbert M. Harriman. Together, they were the parents of two children:

 Annie Cleveland Dodge (b. 1880), who married John H. McCullough.
 William Earl Dodge IV (1883–1927), who married Jessie Sloane (1883–1968), daughter of Henry T. Sloane.  They divorced and she later remarried to George D. Widener Jr.

Dodge died on September 14, 1884.  After his death, she married Stephen Henry Olin, the one-time acting president of Wesleyan University

Legacy
Dodge is the namesake of Dodge-Osborn Hall. His brother Cleveland commissioned sculptor Daniel Chester French to build a memorial to Earl, dedicated  May 30, 1913. Officially titled Earl Dodge Memorial (The Princeton Student), the statue became popularly known as 'The Christian Student'.

References

External links

1858 births
1886 deaths
Players of American football from New York City
William E. III
19th-century players of American football
American football halfbacks
Princeton Tigers football players